This is a list of hat-tricks scored in matches involving the Germany national football team.

Hat-tricks for Germany and West Germany

Hat-tricks conceded by Germany and West Germany

See also
 Germany national football team records and statistics
 Germany national football team results

References

Hat-tricks
Germany
Germany